Vangueria cyanescens, the Kalahari wild-medlar, is a species of flowering plant in the family Rubiaceae. It is found in Angola, Botswana, Namibia, and Zambia. The epithet is a Latin adjective meaning dark or deep blue, referring to the colour of the leaves, especially after drying.

References

External links 
 World Checklist of Rubiaceae

Flora of Angola
Flora of Botswana
Flora of Namibia
Flora of Zambia
cyanescens